This is a list of players who have played at least one game for the Toronto Maple Leafs, Toronto Arenas, and Toronto St. Patricks of the National Hockey League (NHL). It does not include players from the Toronto Blueshirts of the National Hockey Association (NHA). Players currently playing with the Maple Leafs (or currently playing with their AHL farm club, the Toronto Marlies, after playing at least one game with the parent club) are in bold.

Key
  Appeared in a Maple Leafs game during the 2021–2022 season.
  Hockey Hall of Famer or member of a Stanley Cup Champion team.

The "Seasons" column lists the first year of the season of the player's first game and the last year of the season of the player's last game. For example, a player who played one game in the 2000–2001 season would be listed as playing with the team from 2000–2001, regardless of what calendar year the game occurred within.

Statistics include only those accumulated while playing with Toronto.

Statistics complete as of the 2021–2022 NHL season.

Goaltenders

Skaters



References
2005 Official Guide & Record Book 
Toronto Arenas on hockeydb.com
Toronto St. Patricks on hockeydb.com
Toronto Maple Leafs on hockeydb.com

Toronto Maple Leafs

players